Zeta Aquarii (ζ Aquarii, ζ Aqr) is the Bayer designation for a triple star system, the central star of the "water jar" asterism in the equatorial constellation of Aquarius. The combined apparent visual magnitude of this system is 3.65, which is readily visible to the naked eye.

Etymology
In the catalogue of stars in the Calendarium of Al Achsasi Al Mouakket, this star was designated Achr al Achbiya (آخر ألأخبية - ākhir al-akhbiya), which was translated into Latin as Postrema Tabernaculorum, meaning the end of luck of the homes (tents). This star, along with γ Aqr (Sadachbia), π Aqr (Seat) and η Aqr (Hydria), were al-Akḣbiya (الأخبية), the Tents.

Properties
The binary was measured by William Herschel in 1779 however Christian Mayer, listed an earlier observation in his first double-star catalog in 1784 so its true discoverer is not clear. The two stars have an orbital period of about 587 years. The semimajor axis is 3.8 arcseconds and they have an orbital eccentricity of 0.40. The orbital plane is inclined by 138.2° to the line of sight.

The brighter component, ζ Aquarii A (also called ζ2 Aquarii), is a yellow-white-hued F-type main sequence star with an apparent magnitude of +4.42. Its companion, ζ Aquarii B (also called ζ1 Aquarii), is a yellow-white-hued F-type subgiant with an apparent magnitude of +4.51. The fact that their brightness is so similar makes the pair easy to measure and resolve.

Zeta Aquarii A is known to be an astrometric binary system, as it undergoes regular perturbations from its orbit. It has a 26-year orbital period and a semimajor axis of 0.11″.

Zeta Aquarii is currently a northern hemisphere object. In 2004 it was directly above the celestial equator, and before that it was located south of it.

References

External links
 Double Stars to Follow, Part IV: Zeta Aquarii and Mu Cygni. by Martin Gaskell, Prairie Astronomy Club Home Page.
 "This Month's Double Stars" by Richard Jaworski.
 Image ζ Aquarii

Aquarius (constellation)
Aquarii, Zeta
Aquarii, 055
213051
Binary stars
F-type main-sequence stars
F-type subgiants
110960
8558/9
Durchmusterung objects